St. Dominic Savio Preparatory High School, formerly St. Dominic Savio High School, was a Roman Catholic high school located in the East Boston neighborhood of Boston, Massachusetts. The school was founded in 1958 and closed in 2007.

History
The school was founded as an all-boys school in 1958 by the Salesians of Don Bosco, a Catholic religious order. Alumnus Paul Abbott recalled a day when the student body voted on whether the school should add football or hockey as a new sport:
It was 1970, the Bobby Orr era in Boston, so we chose hockey.

In 1993, the Salesians of Don Bosco closed Savio, but an alumni group lead by Peter J. Bagley redesigned an education strategy, convert to a coeducational preparatory school and leased a portion of the property.

New direction
From 1995–2005, Savio Prep's enrollment grew to over 400 co-ed students. In 2003, a former athletic director pleaded guilty to molesting three female athletes, and in 2006 a former wrestling coach pleaded guilty to raping two students and hazing three others. Enrollment declined and finances became tight.

School closed
At the end of the 2006–2007 school year, the Salesian owners of the building did not renew the lease, citing the deteriorating condition of the building and lack of funds to repair it. Concerned parents and alumni began meeting to discuss ways to keep the school open. The group called themselves "Save Our Savio," but could never muster enough funding or support to find the school a new location. It was clear that 2006–2007 had been the last St. Dominic Savio school year.

The building now houses the Edward W. Brooke Charter School. An addition has been built on the site of the former Salesian residence.

Demographics

Heads of school

Notable alumni
Carlo Basile, member of the Massachusetts House of Representatives
Eddie Palladino, Boston Celtics public address announcer
Robert Travaglini, President of the Massachusetts Senate 2003–2007
Ian Bremmer, Political Scientist
Edward Kelly,
General President International Association of Fire Fighters

References

High schools in Boston
Defunct Catholic secondary schools in Massachusetts
Educational institutions established in 1958
Educational institutions disestablished in 2007
East Boston
Salesian secondary schools
1958 establishments in Massachusetts